Yefimovo is a rural locality (a village) in Yenangskoye Rural Settlement, Kichmengsko-Gorodetsky District, Vologda Oblast, Russia. The population was 33 as of 2002.

Geography 
Yefimovo is located 76 km southeast of Kichmengsky Gorodok (the district's administrative centre) by road. Verkhnyaya Yentala is the nearest rural locality.

References 

Rural localities in Kichmengsko-Gorodetsky District